The discography of English post-hardcore band Fightstar consists of thirteen singles, one EP, four studio albums, one compilation album and seventeen music videos.

Albums

Extended plays

Compilation albums

Singles

Other songs

Music videos

References

Discographies of British artists
Rock music group discographies
Discography